Les Films Corona was a French film distribution company based in Paris. Active between the 1930s and the 1970s, it also took part in film production during its later years under the guidance of Robert Dorfmann. It enjoyed its greatest success in the postwar era. Many of its films such as 1968's Mayerling were co-productions.

Selected filmography

 François Villon (1945)
 Bethsabée (1947)
 Crossroads of Passion (1948)
 Woman Without a Past (1948)
 Mademoiselle Has Fun (1948)
Manon (1949)
 Une si jolie petite plage (1949)
 Five Red Tulips (1949)
 At the Grand Balcony (1949)
 The Perfume of the Lady in Black (1949)
 The Lovers Of Verona (1949)
 Thus Finishes the Night (1949)
 Miquette (1950)
 A Man Walks in the City (1950)
 We Will All Go to Paris (1950)
 Bed for Two; Rendezvous with Luck (1950)
 The Chocolate Girl (1950)
 Beauty and the Devil (1950)
 The Glass Castle (1950)
 La Marie du port (1950)
 Without Leaving an Address (1951)
 Mr. Peek-a-Boo (1951)
 Adventures of Captain Fabian (1951)
 The Turkey (1951)
 Matrimonial Agency (1952)
 Forbidden Games (1952)
 The House on the Dune (1952)
 Les Compagnes de la nuit (1953)
 The Virtuous Scoundrel (1953)
 The Air of Paris (1954)
 Tempest in the Flesh (1954)
Touchez pas au grisbi (1954)
 The Lovers of Lisbon (1955)
 Magic Village (1955)
 House on the Waterfront (1955)
 Gervaise (1956)
 Virginie (1962)
 Relax Darling (1964)
 La Grande Vadrouille (1966)
 Col cuore in gola (1967)
 The Day of the Owl (1968)
 Death Laid an Egg (1968)
 The Great Silence (1968)
 Mayerling (1968)
 The Most Beautiful Month (1968)
 Manon 70 (1968)
 Army of Shadows (1969)
 The Conspirators (1969)
 Tristana (1970)
 Red Sun (1971)
 A Lizard in a Woman's Skin (1971)
 Long Live Robin Hood (1971)
 Ivanhoe, the Norman Swordsman (1971)
 The Iguana with the Tongue of Fire (1971)
 Trafic (1971)
 Un flic (1972)
 Papillon (1973)
 Challenge to White Fang (1974)
 The Blue Ferns (1977)
 Womanlight (1979)

References

Bibliography
 Crisp, C.G. The Classic French Cinema, 1930-1960. Indiana University Press, 1993

French film studios
Film production companies of France
Film distributors of France